Vermont Route 23 (VT 23) is a  north–south state highway in Addison County, Vermont, United States. It is maintained by the towns of Middlebury and Weybridge and runs north from VT 125 in Middlebury to VT 17 in Weybridge.

Route description

VT 23 begins at an intersection with VT 125 (College Street) in the town of Middlebury, just a block north of VT 30 (South Main Street). VT 23, maintained locally its entire length rather than by the state of Vermont, runs northwest past some homes as a two-lane road on the western side of Middlebury. Paralleling the Otter Creek, leaving downtown Middlebury near a junction with Pulp Mill Bridge Road. The route turns rural, changing names to Weybridge Road, passing several farms. Now in the town of Weybridge, VT 23 continues northwest, reaching a junction with James Road, in the center of Weybridge, turning north until Quaker Village Road. At that junction, VT 23 turns northwest past Weybridge Cemetery, leaving the section of Weybridge with some business.

Now in the rural sections of Weybridge again, VT 23 makes a gradual curve to the southwest near the junction with Drake Road, the route returns to a parallel with the Otter Creek. Continuing along the creek, the route and the waterway make a big turn to the north, crossing through rural Addison County. VT 23 turns away from the creek for a short distance, returning to sides at Thompson Hill Road. At Thompson Hill Road, the route changes from westward to the north again, winding through farms to a junction with Snake Mountain Road. There, the route turns northeast for a short stretch, turning northward again and reaching a junction with the state-maintained VT 17 near the line with the towns of Addison and New Haven. This junction marks the northern terminus of VT 23.

Major intersections

References

External links

023
Transportation in Addison County, Vermont